Heinz Günthardt and Balázs Taróczy were the defending champions, but lost in the first round this year.

Pavel Složil and Tomáš Šmíd won the title, defeating Carl Limberger and Mike Myburg 6–4, 6–0 in the final.

Seeds

  Heinz Günthardt /  Balázs Taróczy (first round)
  Pavel Složil /  Tomáš Šmíd (champions)
  Marcos Hocevar /  Cássio Motta (quarterfinals)
  Markus Günthardt /  Roland Stadler (first round)

Draw

Draw

References
Draw

1982 in Swiss sport
1982 Grand Prix (tennis)
1982 Geneva Open